Fred J. Borch (April 28, 1910 – March 1, 1995) was an American businessman who was chairman and CEO of General Electric from 1967 to 1972 and president and CEO from 1963 to 1967.

He served as chairman of The Business Council from 1969 to 1970.

References

General Electric people
1910 births
1995 deaths
American chief executives of Fortune 500 companies
20th-century American businesspeople
General Electric chief executive officers